The 2020–21 season is Dinamo Sassari's 62nd in existence and the club's 12th consecutive season in the top tier Italian basketball.

Kit 
Supplier: EYE Sport Wear / Sponsor: Banco di Sardegna

Players

Current roster

Depth chart

Squad changes

In 

|}

Out 

|}

Confirmed 

|}

Coach

Competitions

Supercup

Group stage

Playoffs

Serie A

Basketball Champion League

Regular season

References 

2021–22 Basketball Champions League
2021–22 in Italian basketball by club